Walsh Nunatak is a nunatak on the north side of Haines Glacier, 8 nautical miles (15 km) southwest of Mount Axworthy, in the Dana Mountains, Palmer Land. Mapped by United States Geological Survey (USGS) from surveys and U.S. Navy air photos, 1961–67. Named by Advisory Committee on Antarctic Names (US-ACAN) for John J. Walsh, biologist, member of the Palmer Station-Eastwind Expedition, summer 1965–66.

Nunataks of Palmer Land